Tom Gleeson (born 26 September 1985) is a former Irish rugby union player. He played as a centre.

Munster
He made his Munster debut against Border Reivers in September 2006. His first try for Munster came against Connacht in December 2010. Gleeson left Munster at the end of the 2011–12 season.

References

External links
Munster Profile

1985 births
Living people
Rugby union players from County Cork
Irish rugby union players
Munster Rugby players
Cork Constitution players
Ireland international rugby sevens players
Rugby union centres